The Twelve Tribes, formerly known as the Vine Christian Community Church, the Northeast Kingdom Community Church, the Messianic Communities, and the Community Apostolic Order is a new religious movement founded by Gene Spriggs (now known as Yoneq) that sprang out of the Jesus movement in 1972 in Chattanooga, Tennessee.
The group calls itself an attempt to recreate the 1st-century church as it is described in the Book of Acts; the name "Twelve Tribes" is also derived from a quote of the Apostle Paul in Acts 26:7. The group has ignited controversy and garnered unfavorable attention from the media, the anti-cult movement and governments.

History
The origins of the Twelve Tribes movement can be traced back to a ministry for teenagers which was called the "Light Brigade" in 1972. The ministry operated out of a small coffee shop called "The Lighthouse" in the home of Gene Spriggs and his wife Marsha. The Light Brigade began living communally and opened a restaurant called "The Yellow Deli" while its members were attending several churches, before they decided to join the First Presbyterian Church. Members of the Light Brigade, while affiliated with First Presbyterian, caused friction within its establishment by bringing in anyone who was willing to come with them, including members of different social classes and racial groups, a practice which was not engaged in at that time. On January 12, 1975, the group arrived at First Presbyterian only to find out that the service had been cancelled for the Super Bowl, this led the group to form The Vine Christian Community Church. During this time, the church "planted" churches, each with its own Yellow Deli, in Dalton and Trenton, Georgia; Mentone, Alabama; and Dayton, Tennessee.

Their withdrawal from the religious mainstream turned what had been a friction-filled relationship into an outcry against them. They began holding their own services, which they called "Critical Mass" in Warner Park, appointing elders and baptizing people outside any denominational authority. The deteriorating relationship between the group and the religious and secular Chattanooga community attracted the attention of The Parents' Committee to Free Our Children from the Children of God and the Citizen's Freedom Foundation who labeled the church a cult and heavily attacked Spriggs as a cult leader. This led to what the group refers to today as the "Cult Scare" in the late seventies. A series of deprogrammings starting in the summer of 1976 were carried out by Ted Patrick. The group nevertheless largely ignored the negative press and the wider world in general, and continued to operate its businesses opening the Areopagus cafe and a second local Yellow Deli in downtown Chattanooga. In 1978, an invitation was received from a small church in Island Pond, Vermont for Spriggs to minister there; the offer was declined but the group began moving in stages to the rural town, naming the church there The Northeast Kingdom Community Church. One of Patrick's last deprogramming cases in Chattanooga occurred in 1980; it involved a police detective who, according to Swantko, had his 27-year-old daughter arrested on a falsified warrant in order to facilitate her deprogramming, with the support of local judges. The group continued moving, closing down all of its Yellow Delis and associated churches except for the one in Dalton. At one point, a leader conceded that the group was deeply in debt before closing the Dalton church down and moving the last members to Vermont.

The move to Vermont, combined with an initial period of economic hardship, caused some members to leave. The Citizen's Freedom Foundation conducted several meetings in Barton to draw attention to the group. The Citizen's Freedom Foundation had made allegations of mind control in Chattanooga, but now it made accusations of child abuse. In 1983, charges were brought against Charles "Eddie" Wiseman (an elder in the group) for misdemeanor simple assault; this, combined with multiple child custody cases, formed the basis for a search warrant. On June 22, 1984 Vermont State Police and Vermont Social Rehabilitation Services seized 112 children. Forty cases were dismissed as the parents refused to give the names of their children. Due to what the group perceived were a massive misunderstanding of the events and concerns leading up to and surrounding the raid, its members began formal relationships with their neighbors. Two months after the raid, the case against Wiseman fell apart after the main witness recanted, saying he was under duress from the anticult movement. The case was later dropped in 1985 after a judge ruled that Wiseman had been denied his right to a speedy trial. Eddie Wiseman's public defender, Jean Swantko, who had been present during the raid, later joined and married Wiseman.

By 1989, the church had become widely accepted in Island Pond and grew substantially during the 1980s and 1990s, opening branches in several different countries, including Canada, Australia, Brazil, Spain, Germany, Argentina, and the United Kingdom. During this expansion phase, the group used the name Messianic Communities, before deciding to rename itself The Twelve Tribes. Through the mid-2000s (decade), the group remained controversial, with accusations of child labor, custodial interference, and illegal homeschooling. In 2006, the group held a reunion for members and friends of the Vine Christian Community Church and the former Yellow Deli in Warner Park, announcing a new community in Chattanooga. The movement proceeded to open a new Yellow Deli in 2008, nearly 30 years after leaving Chattanooga.

The founder of the movement, Elbert Eugene Spriggs Jr. (May 18, 1937 — January 11, 2021), died in 2021 while visiting his Hiddenite, North Carolina property.

Beliefs and practices
The Twelve Tribes' beliefs resemble those of Christian fundamentalism, the Hebrew Roots movement, Messianic Judaism and the Sacred Name Movement; however, the group believes that all other denominations are fallen, and it therefore  refuses to align itself with any denomination or movement.  It believes that in order for the messiah to return, the Church needs to be restored to its original form as it is described in Acts 2:38–42 and Acts 4:32–37. This restoration is not merely the restoration of the 1st-century church, but the creation of a new Israel which should consist of Twelve Tribes which are located in twelve geographic regions.  Part of this restoration is the return to observing the sabbath, maintaining some of the Mosaic law including dietary laws, and the festivals. This interpretation of the prophesied restoration of Israel, combined with the perceived immorality in the world leads the group to believe that the end times has arrived, though no date has been set.

One noted aspect of the group is its insistence on using the name "Yahshua", as opposed to Jesus. Because the name "Yahshua" represents the nature of Jesus, the group similarly bestows upon each member a Hebrew name that is meant to reflect the personality of the individual.

The group believes there are Three Eternal Destinies. It believes that after the Fall of Man every person is given a conscience; and that after dying every person goes to a state of being called death regardless of faith. Upon the second coming, believers will be brought back for the thousand years to reign with "Yahshua" before the last judgment. At the end of this millennium, all of the nonbelievers will be judged according to their deeds and put into one of two groups: the righteous and the filthy/unjust. The filthy and the unjust will be sent to the Lake of Fire while the righteous will go on into eternity and fill the universe.

Leadership and structure 

The leadership within is structured as a series of Councils which consists of local councils, regional councils, and a global Apostolic Council; the group is also overseen within these councils by a fluid number of teachers, deacons, deaconesses, elders and apostles. Gene Spriggs is highly regarded as the first person to open up his home to brothers and sisters, but members state that he is not regarded as a spiritual figurehead.

The group operates as a 501(d) – "for-profit organization with a religious purpose and a common treasury."  The community pays property taxes, but the 501(d) structure tends to result in no income tax liability.

Courtship and marriage 
Courtship within the Community involves a "waiting period" in which the man or woman expresses their desire to get to know the other person. The couple then receives input from the community while spending time together. The couple is betrothed (engaged) if their parents (or the entire community, if they are adults) confirm their love and compatibility; the couple is then permitted to hold hands.

Weddings are dramatized pre-enactments of what the group believes will happen at the end of time when "Yahshua" returns to earth for his bride.

Children 
Children have been noted to play a central role in the group's eschatological beliefs, especially the sons. The Twelve Tribes believe that it is the parents' responsibility to properly enforce a consequence for sin (wrongful action, words, behavior) so as to allow the child to maintain the state of a clean conscience. This causes the child to understand accountability to the choices they make. Over time, the children's children will be better equipped to deal with or "overcome" the faults of their predecessors. This will enable future generations of the group to hopefully be the "144,000" of Revelation 7. Children are homeschooled. Within the group, teenagers may take on apprenticeships in the group's industries to be taught trades complementing their education. The group acknowledges using corporal punishment with a "reed-like rod" like a balloon stick (a minimum) across the child's bottom, though many former members, including children raised in the group, say punishments can include far more severe implements. Group members do not send their children to college, believing that, "college is [not] a healthy environment, either for learning or social development."

Environment 
12 Tribes blames the Green Revolution in significant part for massive social upheaval and the breakdown of the nuclear family. They point to the increased agricultural productivity of the 20th century as a force pushing women to work outside the home and other forms of social disconnection.

They practice only organic agriculture and object to the allowance of genetically modified crops under organic standards. Even when comparing themselves to other religious groups, they negatively compare others to genetically modified seeds and themselves positively to the pre-existing, natural genetic background of a crop.

Businesses 
The Twelve Tribes attempts to support itself through means that allow its members to work together, without the need to seek outside employment. Businesses the group owns and operates include:

 Parchment Press: A printing company offering printing services, and also printing and selling the group's literature.
 BOJ Construction: a general contractor based in Plymouth, Massachusetts and operating nationally
 Commonwealth Construction: construction contracting, primarily in the Southeastern US
 Greener Formulas: A soap and bodycare research and development firm with ties to its other business, Common Sense Farm
 Common Sense Farm: A soap and bodycare products manufacturing and distribution facility located on the group's farm in Cambridge, New York
 Simon the Tanner: a chain of shoe stores/outdoor outfitters, currently with locations in New Hampshire and Vermont
 Maté Factor: a yerba mate import company that also runs two cafes, in Manitou Springs, Colorado and Savannah, Georgia
 Tribal Trading: an organic foods distribution company based in Irún, Spain
 A farm in Kansas.
 A construction business in Colorado. For that particular community, the construction industry is their main financial success.

The group also runs restaurant chains:

 Yellow Deli Restaurants
 Common Ground Cafe Restaurants

Controversies
Since its inception, the group has ignited controversy and garnered unfavorable attention from the media, the anti-cult movement and governments.

New England Institute of Religious Research's Executive Director the Rev. Bob Pardon warns in his report that "Messianic Communities, under the leadership of Spriggs, has tended towards an extreme authoritarianism" and a  "Galatian heresy." The Tribes have responded with a line-by-line response to the report and they continue to contest its large "errors, distortions, misunderstandings, and misjudgments", while criticizing the heavy use of apostates in his report. In France, the group was listed on the 1995 Governmental Report by the Parliamentary Commission on Cults in France under the name "Ordre apostolique – Therapeutic healing environment."

Twelve Tribes members Jean Swantko and husband Ed Wiseman have made efforts to combat social stigma and the anti-cult movement by engaging in dialogue with hostile ex-members, the media and government authorities. Swantko has presented at scholarly conferences including CESNUR Communal Studies Association and Society for the Scientific Study of Religion as well as a chapter in James T. Richardson's Regulating Religion: Case Studies from Around the Globe.

The Twelve Tribes has been cited by Stuart A. Wright as a group suffering from "front-end/back-end disproportionality" in media coverage. According to Wright, the media often focuses on unsubstantiated charges against the group, but as charges are investigated and as cases fall apart, the media covers them significantly less at the end than it does at the beginning. Wright then asserts that this leaves the public with the impression that the group was guilty of the disproven charges.

The Island Pond raid
On June 22, 1984, Vermont State police arrived at the Twelve Tribes’ Island Pond residences and took custody of hundreds of group members with their children, based on an investigation of accusations of child abuse.  All cases were dismissed when a judge found that the search warrant was unconstitutional.  The Island Pond raid has remained prominent in Vermont legal history and was the subject of a Vermont Bar Association seminar in 2006. The group held anniversary events in both 1994 and 2000; and produced a 75-minute documentary. The Vermont Chapter of the ACLU also criticized the raid, calling it "frightening" and "the greatest deprivation of civil liberties to have occurred in recent Vermont history." Richard Snelling, the then-Governor of Vermont who had authorized the raid, reportedly drew the "hottest political fire of his career" in the weeks after; while Vermont Attorney General John J. Easton Jr. attributed the raid to assisting his campaign for governorship.  In 1992, John Burchard, who had been the State Commissioner of Social and Rehabilitation Services, and Vanessa L. Malcarne, published an article in Behavioral Sciences and the Law, encouraging changes in the law that would have allowed the raid to succeed.

Teachings about Jews 
The group teaches that the Jews are collectively responsible for the death of Christ, quoting Matthew 27:25. They are often labelled antisemitic, although the group repeatedly denies this accusation. Its members keep the Sabbath and the Jewish festivals of Pesach, Yom Kippur, and Sukkot. Youth hold Bar Mitzvah and Bat Mitzvah celebrations, and they regularly perform Israeli folk dances.

Child labor and homeschooling controversies
In 2001, The New York Post ran an article accusing the group of child labor violations; and later attributed itself as having prompted the investigation. The Twelve Tribes responded with a press conference at the "Commonsense Farm" where the alleged child labor had taken place. The Twelve Tribes reported that during a random inspection by Estée Lauder Companies, the company discovered that several 14-year-olds had been found assisting their fathers in the factory. This report was later confirmed by Estée Lauder who terminated their contract with Common Sense products. The group's official statement at the press conference stated that they believed that it was a family-owned business, and children ought to be able to help their parents in the business while making "no apology" for it. The New York State Department of Labor stated that they intended to visit all five of the Twelve Tribes' businesses. State Attorney General Eliot Spitzer asserted that apprenticeships amounted to indentured servitude and were illegal. Robert Redford's Sundance Catalog, who had contracted with Common Wealth Woodworks (another of the group's industries that made furniture), also terminated their contract as a response to the allegations. The Labor Department found no violations at Common Sense Farm or Commonwealth Woodworks. They did propose a fine on two other industries: $2,000 for allegations of child labor law violations that the group's spokesperson, Jean Swantco Wiseman, was quoted in a news article as saying were for a 15-year-old pushing a wheelbarrow and another 15-year-old changing a lightbulb.

In June 2018, another New York State investigation into the Common Sense Farm was launched, yielding allegations of child labor, after an Inside Edition article revealed children working in the group's soap factory.  Twelve Tribes owned business Greener Formulas had contracted with brands including Acure and Savannah Bee to manufacture its private label bodycare products and was using the facilities of Common Sense Farm (also owned by the group) for production.  Both Acure and Savannah Bee have since terminated their contracts with Greener Formulas.

In Germany and France, the controversies centered on the issues of homeschooling, health, child abuse, and religious freedom. The group has several times been in conflict with authorities in Germany and France over homeschooling their children, with a particularly long and protracted dispute between the community in Klosterzimmern, in the municipality of Deiningen, Bavaria, and Bavarian education authorities. Homeschooling is illegal in Germany, with rare exceptions. When fines and arrests failed to have an effect on the community, authorities granted the group the right to operate a private school on the commune's premises in 2011, under state supervision. The agreement entailed that the school would not teach sex education and evolution. Authorities revoked the school's right to operate in 2013, after it refused to answer to allegations of physical abuse and a lack of certified teaching staff.

Slavery and racism

According to a 2018 report by the Southern Poverty Law Center, the Twelve Tribes teaches its followers that the Bible holds that Blacks were to be servants of whites, and that "slavery was 'a marvelous opportunity' for Black people" who would have been without hope otherwise. Nevertheless there are Black members of the Twelve Tribes, which teaches that "slavery is over for those who believe". The SPLC concludes that since Twelve Tribes views only themselves as true believers, this does not apply to any black person outside the group.

Other issues
On September 5, 2013, German police raided two communities belonging to the Twelve Tribes and removed 40 children to protect them from continued abuse. The reasons for the raid were the film shootings of a TV reporter, Wolfram Kuhnigk, who managed to secretly record how the sect beat their children. The group admits that they use a "reed-like rod" for discipline, but denies abusing their children. Sociologist of religion Susan Palmer pointed out that the doctors found no evidence of mistreatment in September 2013 following the police raids. In 2018, the European Court of Human Rights upheld the German move to take away the children from the sect.

On June 26, 2018, the religious group was showcased on the Vice HD channel in the United States on an episode of their Cults and Extreme Belief series, as former member Samie Brosseau accused the group of abusive practices.

In July 2019, the FBI released a 40-page summary of the results of a closed preliminary investigation stemming from allegations of child abuse at the group's Hiddenite NC Property.  The documents revealed the existence of other investigations over the years to include suspicions of child abuse in other compounds.  There were also more bizarre allegations including deaths that were thought to be suspicious, allegations of oddities during spiritual rituals, as well as unsubstantiated allegations involving Founder Yoneq's conduct during his time in the Military.  The documents also reveal the existence of a (now closed) Federal investigation into whether the State of Vermont had violated the group's civil rights in the 1984 raid.

On February 19, 2020, Police in New South Wales Australia executed a search warrant as part of Strike Force Nanegai, on the group's Peppercorn Creek Farm property, seizing documents and other evidence in what has been a prolonged investigation into allegations of child abuse in the group.

On March 3, 2020, police in New South Wales Australia returned for a more extensive search operation for stillborn babies buried on the property at Peppercorn Creek Farm and another of the groups properties.  On March 7, an updated report said the body of at least one infant was found at the farm.  In September 2020, NSW police announced in a statement they anticipated a close of the investigation late 2020 or early 2021.  No official closure or criminal charges has been announced as of October 2021.

In January 2022, early investigations into the origin of the Boulder County, Colorado Marshall Fire suggested a Twelve Tribes residential property may have been the point of origination for the fire. The fire investigation brought renewed media scrutiny of the Boulder-area group. In February 2022, the Boulder County Sheriff's office said the investigation into the cause of the fire remains ongoing, and that it was still considering coal mines, power lines, and human activity in the area as possible causes of the fire.

Outreach

The Twelve Tribes utilizes mobile operations and vehicles to evangelize at various events.

 Peacemaker Marine: A Class-A barquentine sailing ship bought and restored by the group sailing on the Eastern coast of the United States. The group now gives tours and evangelizes at ports.
 Peacemaker I & II Buses: A custom PD-4501 Scenicruiser with added floor from the roof of an Aerocoach
 A first aid tent is set up at various events by the group.

See also
 Antisemitism in Christianity
 Black Hebrew Israelites
 Groups claiming affiliation with Israelites
 Jesus Army
 Jesus People USA
 Restorationism

Explanatory notes

References

External links

 Twelve Tribes official website
 "Children of the Island Pond Raid: An Emerging Culture" (documentary on the Island Pond Raid at the Twelve Tribes YouTube channel)
 Cult Education: Twelve Tribes

1972 establishments in Tennessee
Christian communities
Christian fundamentalism
Christian new religious movements
Christian organizations established in 1972
Christianity in Tennessee
Christianity in Vermont
Cults
Culture of Chattanooga, Tennessee
Intentional communities in the United States
Island Pond, Vermont
Jesus movement
Messianic Judaism